Bijoy Garg (born July 15, 2002) is an American racing driver. He is set to compete in the 2023 USF Pro 2000 Championship driving for DEForce Racing. He previously competed in the USF2000 Championship with DEForce Racing and Jay Howard Driver Development.

Career

Formula 4 United States Championship 
On June 10, 2020, Jay Howard Driver Development announced that Garg would compete with them in the Formula 4 United States Championship for the first three rounds of the 2020 season. He would end up finishing 15th in the standings come the end of the season.

Garg would return for the 2021 season competing in rounds 2, 3, 4, and 6. He finished third at the first race in Mid-Ohio. Garg would finish 8th in the championship.

U.S. F2000 National Championship 
At the beginning of 2020, Garg announced that he would compete in the U.S. F2000 National Championship driving for Jay Howard Driver Development in rounds 1–9 and 16–17. He would finish 17th in the championship.

On February 11, 2021, it was announced that Garg would return to the team for a second year. At the New Jersey Motorsports Park and the second Mid-Ohio rounds, Garg would not be eligible for points due to exceeding the maximum allotted test days for championship drivers. He would end up finishing 27th in the standings come the end of the season.

For 2022, Garg would switch to DEForce Racing. He would miss the final three races at Portland since he would compete in the final races of the Indy Pro 2000 Championship. Garg would have a career year with two podiums and finishing 9th in the championship.

USF Pro 2000 Championship 
Midway through the 2022 season, it was announced that Garg would make his series debut at Gateway Motorsports Park. It was expected that he would return to the USF 2000 Championship for the final races of the season, however Garg would drive in the final races at Portland of the USF Pro 2000 Championship.

On November 28, 2022, DEForce Racing announced that Garg would move up to the USF Pro 2000 Championship to compete with the team full time in 2023.

Racing record

Career summary 

* Season still in progress.

American open-wheel racing results

U.S. F2000 National Championship 
(key) (Races in bold indicate pole position) (Races in italics indicate fastest lap) (Races with * indicate most race laps led)

† Garg was not eligible for points at the New Jersey Motorsports Park and the second Mid-Ohio rounds for exceeding the maximum allotted test days for championship drivers.

* Season still in progress.

References 

2002 births
Living people
Racing drivers from California
U.S. F2000 National Championship drivers

Indy Pro 2000 Championship drivers
Asian Le Mans Series drivers
United States F4 Championship drivers